The Storage Networking Industry Association (SNIA) is a registered 501(c)(6) non-profit trade association incorporated in December 1997. SNIA has more than 185 unique members, 2,000 active contributing members and over 50,000 IT end users and storage professionals.  The SNIA absorbed the Small Form Factor Committee.

SNIA's membership community participates in the following storage-related technical working groups:

 Certification
 Cloud Storage Technologies
 Computational Storage
 Data Management
 Data Security
 Dictionary
 Networked Storage
 Next Generation Data Center
 Persistent Memory
 Physical Storage
 Power Efficiency Measurement
 Storage Management Initiative – Specification (SMI-S)
 Storage Management Swordfish Protocol

SNIA and its technical council maintain a vendor-neutral dictionary and glossary of storage networking, data, and information management terminology.

The SNIA dictionary won an award for publication excellence in 2009 and 2012 from the Business Communications Report.

SNIA along with Computerworld hosted the popular Storage Networking World (SNW) Conferences from 1999 to 2013, at various venues around the world, and commonly occurred in the Spring and Fall in the USA, and in the Fall in the EU.

SNIA is also the organizer the Storage Developers Conference (SDC) and manages a vendor-neutral Technology Center in Colorado Springs, Colorado.

SNIA also maintains partnerships with and submits material to other industry standards organizations such as ISO, IEC, DMTF, CXL, INCITS T10, T11, IETF,and IEEE.

Storage Networking Certification Program
The Storage Networking Certification Program (SNCP) is administered by the SNIA. According to the SNIA website, the program:
"Establishes a uniform standard for the storage networking industry by which individual knowledge and skill sets can be verified. The program provides a strong foundation of vendor-neutral, systems level credentials that will integrate with and complement individual vendor certifications."

The following certification credentials are available through the SNCP:
 SCSP: SNIA Certified Storage Professional
 SCSE: SNIA Certified Storage Engineer
 SCSA: SNIA Certified Storage Architect
 SCSN-E: SNIA Certified Storage Networking Expert (requires an additional vendor credential)

References

External links
 

501(c)(6) nonprofit organizations
Technology trade associations